Oleksandr Viktorovych Klymenko (Russian: Александр Викторович Клименко, born November 16, 1980) is a former Ukrainian entrepreneur and politician, having served as former Minister of Revenue and Duties of Ukraine (December 24, 2012 – February 27, 2014) under president Viktor Yanukovych. Following the Revolution of Dignity in February 2014,  Klymenko fled to Russia. He has been on the EU sanction list since April 2014, and his assets have been frozen. Oleksandr Klymenko is wanted by the General Prosecutor of Ukraine for corruption and currently lives in Moscow. In November 2017 Klymenko was charged with high treason claiming he had "deliberately harmed the economic and information security of Ukraine, sovereignty, territorial integrity and inviolability of our state during his tenure."

Biography

Early life, education and business
Oleksandr Klymenko was born on November 16, 1980 in Makiivka, Donetsk oblast (Ukraine).

He graduated from the Donetsk State University of Management, with a master's degree in Finance (Master of Finance).

In February 2010, Klymenko graduated from Dnipropetrovsk Regional Institute of Public Administration at the National Academy for Public Administration under the President of Ukraine, obtaining a Master of Public Administration. The degree was subsequently followed by a PhD in Economics, obtained in 2011.

Between the years of 1997 and 2005, Klymenko was an entrepreneur, founder and CEO of a number of companies. In particular, he co-founded the group of companies "Antaleks".

Political career
Beginning with 2005, Klymenko entered the civil service. He worked his way up to the position of Deputy Head of Donetsk, specialized in auditing large taxpayers.

Head of the State Tax Service of Donetsk 
In 2010, he was appointed to the position of First Deputy Head of the State Tax Administration (STA) of the Donetsk region. Subsequently, in September 2010, Klymenko became the Head of the State Tax Administration of Donetsk. By November 2010, the region had collected over UAH 2 billion in taxes, the highest figure in the history of the Donetsk State Tax Administration.

Head of the State Tax Administration of Ukraine 
On February 18, 2011 by the Decree of the President of Ukraine, Klymenko was appointed to the position of Deputy Head of the State Tax Service of Ukraine before becoming Head of the said authority in November 2011. As Head of the Authority, Klymenko developed standards of accounting and reporting in the field of transfer pricing.

Klymenko implemented a network of standardized and unified service centers for taxpayers, which grew by the end of 2012 to over 470 in Ukraine. In February 2014, it numbered more than 5500. He also opened a dedicated Central Office to service large taxpayers.

In 2012, he initiated a moratorium on conducting audits of SMEs.

Minister of Revenues and Duties of Ukraine 
On December 24, 2012, Klymenko was appointed, by the Decree of the President of Ukraine No. 739/2012, to the new position of Minister of Revenue and Duties of Ukraine in the Azarov government of President Viktor Yanukovich.

The position brought under the same roof the activities of two ministries, which were integrated under Klymenko's stint in 6 months. As minister, he streamlined the country's tax system, reducing the number of taxes from 135 to 22. In a second stage, the number of taxes was supposed to decline to 9-10. As a result, Ukraine moved up by 33 points in the World Bank's Doing Business ranking between 2012 and 2014.

On February 27, 2014, after the fall of Yanukovich, the Verkhovna Rada sacked the Second Azarov Government and dismissed all Ministers, including Oleksandr Klymenko. Klymenko left Ukraine in February 2014, taking refuge in (the capital of Russia) Moscow. According to Klymenko he went into exile "for reasons of security, I would not want to call Moscow my place of residence."

In exile (2014 - ) 
On April 15, 2014 Klymenko's assets in the European Union were frozen when the former minister was placed on the European sanctions list.

Then, Klymenko was issued a notice of suspicion of abuse of power and wanted by the General Prosecutor of Ukraine for the creation of tax evasion scheme.

Klymenko has denied all charges levied against him and has called them "groundless". As a result, he became the first official of the Yanukovych era to judicially attack the said charges. On August 6, the Shevchenkivskiy District Court of Kyiv City ordered the SSU to refute the information pertaining to Klymenko's involvement in tragic events in Odessa on May 2. This information had been disseminated by an employee of the Security Service of Ukraine (SBU), Katerina Kosareva, without providing any evidence. Klymenko filed defamation charges against the SBU and, on November 3, the appellate court found in his favor, judging the information as being "apocryphal".

Since he left Ukraine Klymenko is living in Moscow; Russian prosecutors refuse to extradite him to Ukraine and have stated that they have not received such a request from Ukraine, despite the latter's claims saying otherwise. On 19 December 2014 Klymenko stated: “I hope I will go back to Ukraine in the immediate future" and that he was "prepared to face the Ukrainian people and look at them with my own eyes. And I'm extending my helping hand to my people without stopping for a moment”.

On 17 November 2017 Klymenko was charged with high treason claiming he had "deliberately harmed the economic and information security of Ukraine, sovereignty, territorial integrity and inviolability of our state during his tenure."

Involvement in Ukrainian politics 
In April 2014, in one of his first interviews, Klymenko called the (Ukrainian) Yatsenyuk government's intention of dividing the Ministry of Revenue and Duties in separate entities a "systemic mistake". Afterwards, Ukrainian authorities decided not to follow with their plan.

On August 14, 2014, Internet edition "Glavkom", with reference to sources close to negotiations between Ukraine and IMF, said that the International Monetary Fund consults with the former Minister Klymenko on matters of Ukrainian tax reform. Earlier, Ukrainian media have drawn attention to the fact that the tax laws proposed by the Yatsenyuk Government were inspired by Oleksandr Klymenko's 2012 tax reforms.

In an interview with CNN's Christine Amanpour, Klymenko reiterated his support for a united Ukraine saying that “'Donbass has always been and is part of Ukraine” but that the region should be allowed to decide for itself where they should belong. Klymenko is also the founder of an initiative dedicated to find solutions for the Donbass, called “Restoring Donbas”.

Awards and Ratings

Awards 
02.07.2007 – Letter of award of the Donetsk City Council.
10.11.2010 – Lapel badge of the State Tax Administration of Ukraine for "Outstanding service".
June 29, 2011 – Lapel badge of the State Customs Serviceof Ukraine for "Customs Security of the State" of the ІІ degree.
07.11.2011 – Lapel badge of the State Tax Service of Ukraine "Honorary Employee of the State Tax Service of Ukraine".
February 22, 2012 – Departmental promotional award of the Department of the State Guard of Ukraine for "Contributing to the State Guard".
June 27, 2012 – Lapel badge of the Ministry of Interior "Chevalier of the Law".
August 24, 2012 – Awarded a special rank of the Main State Advisor of the Tax Service.
December 14, 2013 – Awarded a special rank of the Main State Advisor of the Tax and Customs Affairs.

Ratings 
2012 – 17th place in the rating of "top 200 most influential Ukrainians" according to "Focus" magazine.

2012 – 19th place in the rating of "TOP 100 most influential Ukrainians" according to "Korrespondent" magazine.

2013 – 12th place in the rating of "top 200 most influential Ukrainians" according to "Focus" magazine.

2013 – 8th place in the rating of "TOP 100 most influential Ukrainians" according to "Korrespondent" magazine.

Charity 
Ukrainian media reported about a number of charitable contributions made by O.Klymenko.

Notes

References

External links

Official Facebook page of Oleksandr Klymenko
Oleksandr Klymenko in Twitter
Oleksandr Klymenko in Instagram
Official YouTube-channel of Oleksandr Klymenko
State Tax Service of Ukraine opened a central office to service big taxpayers
Keys of electronic signature the Tax Service will issue quickly and for free
Klymenko: "Hotline "Puls podatkovoi" of the Tax Administration was installed"
Oleksandr Klymenko: "Ukraine has proved its competitiveness to world society"

1980 births
Living people
People from Makiivka
Donetsk State University of Management alumni
National Academy of State Administration alumni
Revenue and duties ministers of Ukraine
Party of Regions politicians
Pro-government people of the Euromaidan
Fugitives wanted by Ukraine